The 2022 California Secretary of State election took place on November 8, 2022, to elect the Secretary of State of California. The primary election was held on June 7, 2022.

Incumbent Democrat Shirley Weber was appointed to the position in December 2020 by governor Gavin Newsom. Newsom had appointed incumbent secretary of state Alex Padilla to succeed Kamala Harris as California's junior U.S. senator after Harris was elected Vice President of the United States in 2020.

Candidates

Democratic Party

Declared 
Shirley Weber, incumbent secretary of state

Republican Party

Declared 
Rob Bernosky, businessman
Rachel Hamm, author
James "JW" Paine, truck driver
Raul Rodriguez Jr., retired warehouseman

Green Party

Declared 
Gary N. Blenner, educator

No party preference

Declared 
Matthew D. Cinquanta, private investigator
Desmond A. Silveira (write-in), software engineer (American Solidarity Party)

Endorsements

Primary election

Results

General election

Predictions

Polling

Results

Notes

References

External links
Official campaign websites
Rob Bernosky (R) for Secretary of State
Shirley Weber (D) for Secretary of State

Secretary of State
California
California Secretary of State elections